The Divine Lady is a 1929 American pre-Code Vitaphone sound film with a synchronized musical score, sound effects, and some synchronized singing, but no spoken dialogue. It stars Corinne Griffith and tells the story of the love affair between Horatio Nelson and Emma Hamilton. It featured the theme song "Lady Divine", with lyrics by Richard Kountz and music by Nathaniel Shilkret, which became a popular hit in 1929 and was recorded by numerous artists, such as Shilkret, Frank Munn, Ben Selvin (as the Cavaliers), Smith Ballew, Adrian Schubert, Sam Lanin, and Bob Haring.

The film was adapted by Harry Carr, Forrest Halsey, Agnes Christine Johnston, and Edwin Justus Mayer from the novel The Divine Lady: A Romance of Nelson and Emma Hamilton by E. Barrington. It was directed by Frank Lloyd.

The film won the Academy Award for Best Director and was nominated for Best Actress in a Leading Role (Corinne Griffith) and Best Cinematography. It is the only film to be awarded Best Director without a Best Picture nomination (one year earlier, Two Arabian Knights was awarded for Best Director of a Comedy Picture without being nominated for Best Picture).

Plot
In the late eighteenth century, Lady Hamilton has had a somewhat turbulent relationship with the British people, especially the aristocracy. Born Emma Hart from a very humble background (she being the daughter of a cook), she was seen as being vulgar by the rich, but equally captivating for her beauty. In a move to protect his inheritance, Honorable Charles Greville, Emma's then lover and her mother's employer, sent Emma to Naples under false pretenses to live with his uncle, Sir William Hamilton, where she would study to become a lady. 

Surprisingly to Greville whose deception Emma would eventually discover, Emma ended up becoming Hamilton's wife in a marriage of convenience. But it is Emma's eventual relationship with Horatio Nelson of the British navy that would cause the largest issue. A move by Lady Hamilton helped Nelson's armada defeat Napoleon's fleet in naval battles, which Nelson would have ultimately lost without Lady Hamilton's help. Beyond the dangers of war, Lady Hamilton and Nelson's relationship is ultimately threatened by the court of public opinion as both are married to other people.

Cast
 Corinne Griffith as Emma Hart
 Victor Varconi as Horatio Nelson
 H. B. Warner as Sir William Hamilton
 Ian Keith as Honorable Charles Greville
 Marie Dressler as Mrs. Hart
 Montagu Love as Captain Hardy
 William Conklin as Romney
 Dorothy Cumming as Queen Maria Carolina
 Michael Vavitch as King Ferdinand
 Evelyn Hall as Duchess of Devonshire
 Helen Jerome Eddy as Lady Nelson

Preservation status
The film still survives intact along with its Vitaphone soundtrack. This film was a joint preservation project of the UCLA Film and Television Archive and the Museum of Modern Art Department of Film in cooperation with the Czechoslovak Film Archive. It was restored in conjunction with the project American Moviemakers: The Dawn of Sound.

Home media
In 2009, the film was released on manufactured-on-demand DVD by the Warner Archive Collection.

References

External links 
 
 
 
 
 The Divine Lady at Virtual History

1929 films
1920s biographical films
American biographical films
American silent feature films
American black-and-white films
Films whose director won the Best Directing Academy Award
Transitional sound films
Films directed by Frank Lloyd
First National Pictures films
Napoleonic Wars films
Adultery in films
Films set in England
Films set in London
Films set in Naples
Films set in the 1790s
Films set in the 1800s
Films set in the 1810s
Cultural depictions of Horatio Nelson
Cultural depictions of Emma, Lady Hamilton
1920s historical films
American historical films
1920s English-language films
1920s American films